"Some People Do" is a song recorded by American country music band Old Dominion. It was released on March 2, 2020 as the third single from their self-titled third studio album. The song was written by Matthew Ramsey, Jesse Frasure, Shane McAnally, Thomas Rhett and produced by McAnally.

Background
Band wrote on Twitter: “This song is a side of us we haven’t shown as blatantly, and it’s a little scary to put out into the world, but part of our job as songwriters is to tell the truth, even if it’s hard to go there.”

Music
Matt Ramsey wrote on Instagram: “It’s a breaking-point kind of song. I think inherently we’re all good people and want to be good people, but no matter who you are, sometimes you hurt the ones you love, It’s about that desire to be the best person you can be for those people.”

The song featured a poignant piano melody and strings that fit with the reflective and heartbreaking lyrics.

Music video
The music video was released on April 3, 2020, directed by Mason Allen. It was inspired by Jason Schneidman, celebrity groomer who was once homeless, but changed his life around after battling drug addiction and found Old Dominion joining Schneidman to help his Men’s Groomer Foundation in Los Angeles.

As the band’s poignant single played on behind them, Schneidman and the band doled out haircuts and a hot meal to the local homeless community. 

And band worte on Instagram: “Everything about our friend Jason’s life and mission is what this song is all about. We’re grateful to him for telling his story and helping us capture the spirit of the song. We hope it helps lift you up a bit.”

Commercial performance
As of July 2019, the song has sold 15,000 copies in the United States. It peaked at number 28 on the Billboard Country Airplay chart and number 38 on the Hot Country Songs chart, becoming Old Dominion's lowest-charting single since their debut single, "Shut Me Up", in 2014, and their first single to miss number one since “Snapback” in 2016.

Charts

Weekly charts

Year-end charts

References

2020 singles
2019 songs
Old Dominion (band) songs
Songs written by Jesse Frasure
Songs written by Shane McAnally
Songs written by Matthew Ramsey
Songs written by Thomas Rhett
Song recordings produced by Shane McAnally
RCA Records Nashville singles